Carlos Chacón Galindo (12 December 1934 – 17 February 2021) was a Peruvian politician. He served as Provincial Mayor for Cusco Province from 1967 to 1969 and again from 1987 to 1989.

Biography
He also worked for the César Vallejo University beginning in the mid-2000s.

He won the seat once again, defeating United Left candidate Daniel Estrada. In the 1990 Peruvian general election, he ran for the Congress of the Republic of Peru, but failed to earn a seat after receiving only 1369 votes. In 2006, he ran for Congress again, hoping to represent the Department of Cuzco, but was again defeated after earning 950 votes.

Carlos Chacón Galindo died in Lima on 17 February 2021 at the age of 86.

References

1934 births
2021 deaths
Provincial Mayors of Cusco Province
20th-century Peruvian politicians
César Vallejo University